Lawrence D. Bobo is the W. E. B. Du Bois Professor of the Social Sciences and the Dean of Social Science at Harvard University. His research focuses on the intersection of social psychology, social inequality, politics, and race.

Education 
Bobo graduated magna cum laude from Loyola Marymount University with his Bachelor of Arts degree in sociology in 1979. He then received his Master of Arts degree in 1981 and Doctor of Philosophy degree in 1984, both in sociology, from the University of Michigan.

Early Life 
Bobo is the middle child of three sons born to Dr. Joseph R. Bobo, Sr., a graduate of Meharry Medical College and once the chief of minor trauma at USC County Medical Hospital in Los Angeles, California and Joyce Cooper Bobo, a longtime teacher in the Los Angeles Unified School District.

Bobo’s father is the son of Dr. Fred D. Bobo and Cecilia Philips Bobo of Milwaukee, WI, a Black family with roots in Wisconsin pre-dating statehood. Fred was a long-time Welfare Case worker and a Dentist with a degree in dentistry from Marquette University. He served on the Milwaukee Public Museum Board of Trustees as Vice Chair and on the Governor’s Commission on Human Rights. The family lived and Fred Bobo practiced dentistry in the historic Black Milwaukee community known as Bronzeville.

His mother is the daughter of Ann Nixon Cooper, the 106 year old Atlanta Black woman mentioned by Barack Obama in his victory speech given in Grant Park, Chicago upon his election as President in 2008.  He wrote of his relationship with her in a blog-post for The Root at the time of her death.

He grew up in the San Fernando Valley, living in Pacoima when young and in Granada Hills in his teenage years, attending public schools in the Los Angeles Unified School District from kindergarten through graduating high school. After high school he attended college at Loyola Marymount University where he became president of the Speech and Debate Club in his Junior Year, once moderating a campus debate between Republican Congressman and LMU alum Robert K. Dornan and famed attorney Gloria Allred.

Career 
Bobo has held tenured appointments in the sociology departments at the University of Wisconsin, Madison (1989–1991), University of California, Los Angeles (1993–1997), Stanford University (2005–2007), and Harvard University (1997–2004, 2008–present).

He is a founding editor of the Du Bois Review, published by Cambridge University Press. He is co-author of the book Racial Attitudes in America: Trends and Interpretations and senior editor of Prismatic Metropolis: Inequality in Los Angeles. His most recent book Prejudice in Politics: Group Position, Public Opinion, and the Wisconsin Treaty Rights Dispute was a finalist for the 2007 C. Wright Mills Award.

Bobo is an elected member of the National Academy of Sciences as well as a Fellow of the American Academy of Arts and Sciences and the American Association for the Advancement of Science. He is a Guggenheim Fellow, an Alphonse M. Fletcher Sr. Fellow, a Fellow of the Center for Advanced Study in the Behavioral Sciences, and a Russell Sage Foundation Visiting Scholar.

Somewhere Between Jim Crow & Post-Racialism 
Bobo is also known for the journal article Somewhere Between Jim Crow & Post-Racialism: Reflections on the Racial Divide in America Today that details the effects the 'post-racialism' perspective has on the world. 

Bobo’s article is significant because it details the evolution of racism over time and how it has furthered into a permeable existence. When we claim to live in a ‘post-racialism’ world we deny the existence of discrimination. Implications of the ‘post-racialism’ world are overlooking the newly formed progressive attitudes that have taken the place of prejudice and discrimination.

Bobo shares three perspectives for post-racialism, the first stating “One of these meaning attached to the waning silence of what some have portrayed as a “black victimology” narrative. From this perspective, black complaints and grievances about inequality and discrimination are well worn tales”. Bobo’s first perspective is relevant to the current political state and an NPR article supports Bobo’s claims, discussing the African American slavery reparations bill in Congress having difficulty passing. Republicans stating, “Spend $20 million for a commission that’s already decided to take money from people who were never involved in the evil of slavery and give it to people who were never subject to the evil of slavery”. Demonstrating the ‘post-racialism’ perspective in real time that racism is seen as a past tense with the post-racialism perspective.

Next, Bobo’s second perspective is the genetic makeup of Americans shifting away from the previous black and white divide. It has become generally more acceptable for interracial couples and biracial children in today’s world and the ‘post-racialism’ perspective embraces this in a positive way. Bobo states “Americans increasingly revere mixture and hybridity and are rushing to embrace a decidedly “beige” view of themselves and what is good for the body politic. Old fashioned racial dichotomies pale against the surge toward flexible, deracialized, and mixed ethnoracial identities and outlooks”. Emphasizing the forward-thinking Bobo’s article has in reference to society; however, this integration of race still allowed the one drop rule to occur. The one drop rule states one drop of African American blood, meaning ANY African descendants, will obligate you to identify as African American.

Additionally, Bobo’s third perspective of ‘post-racialism’ is color blindness, moving beyond the barriers of race as a nation. You will be unable to see discrimination if you do not see race to see the prejudice that takes place in the United States. Recognizing that racial groups face discrimination is necessary to progress and develop change by taking accountability for past wrongs. Furthermore, African American achievement signaled a shift into ‘post-racialism’, Barack Obama for instance, the president of the United States, is symbolic of ‘post-racialism’ to some analysts according to Bobo. If a person within a marginalized group could reach a status of high achievement than there is the naïve assumption that racial discrimination cannot exist. On the other hand, in his book he mentions the previous studies gathered data on the racial attitude within the United States, the study was used to support Jim Crow laws and insisted that black people were inferior to white people, stating “Accordingly, blacks were understood as inherently inferior to whites, both intellectually and temperamentally. As a result, society was to be expressly ordered in terms of white privilege, with blacks relegated to secondary status in education, access to jobs, and in civic status such as the right to vote.” However, according to the Gallup Poll within Bobo’s book these ideas have since significantly declined since the 1940’s indicating a large public shift in attitudes toward race.

In addition, Bobo talks about the wealth disparity between white and black families in the United States. According to the Brandeis University study cited by Bobo, displays African Americans falling, even the highest earned, significantly behind white family’s wealth. Bobo elaborates on the importance of generational wealth and the benefits it can have for future generations stating, “To the extent that wealth bears on the capacity to survive a period of unemployment, to finance college for one’s children, or to endure a costly illness or other unexpected large expense, these figures point to an enormous and growing disparity in the life chances of blacks and white in the United States.” Bobo is recognizing the implications of marginalization on the basis of race have on communities socially and financially and on the generations of black people today.

Awards and honors 
 Warren J. Mitofsky Award for Excellence in Public Opinion Research, The Roper Center, University of Connecticut (2021)
 Award for Exceptionally Distinguished Achievement, American Association for Public Opinion Research (2020)
 Phi Beta Kappa (Alumni Member), Omega Chapter of California, Loyola Marymount University (2020)
 Outstanding Book Award, American Association for Public Opinion Research (for Prejudice in Politics) (2018)
 W.E.B. Du Bois Fellow, American Association of Political and Social Science (2017)
 Charles Horton Cooley-George Herbert Mead Award for a Career of Distinguished Scholarship in Sociological Social Psychology, American Sociological Association (2012)
 Outstanding Book Award, American Association for Public Opinion Research (for Racial Attitudes in America) (2005)

Selected bibliography

Books 
Bobo, Lawrence D.; Tuan, Mia (2006). Prejudice in Politics: Group Position, Public Opinion, and the Wisconsin Treaty Rights Dispute. Cambridge: Harvard University Press. .
Bobo, Lawrence D. (ed.) (2003). Race, Racism, and Discrimination. Social Psychology Quarterly special issue 66(4).
Bobo, Lawrence; O’Connor, Alice; Tilly, Chris (eds.) (2001). Urban Inequality: Evidence From Four Cities. New York: Russell Sage Foundation. .
Bobo, Lawrence; Oliver, Melvin L.; Johnson, James H.; Valenzuela, Abel (eds.) (2000). Prismatic Metropolis: Inequality in Los Angeles. New York: Russell Sage Foundation. .
Bobo, Lawrence D.; Sears, David O.; Sidanius, James (eds.) (2000). Racialized Politics: The Debate about Racism in America. Chicago: University of Chicago Press. .
Bobo, Lawrence D. (ed.) (1997). Race, Public Opinion and Society. Public Opinion Quarterly special issue 61(1).
Bobo, Lawrence D.; Krysan, Maria; Schuman, Howard; Steeh, Charlotte (1997). Racial Attitudes in America: Trends and Interpretations. Cambridge: Harvard University Press. .

Book chapters

References

External links
Harvard University Scholar Profile
Harvard University Department of Sociology

Living people
African-American social scientists
American social scientists
Members of the United States National Academy of Sciences
University of Michigan alumni
Harvard University faculty
Stanford University faculty
1958 births
21st-century African-American people
20th-century African-American people